Mario Kame (born 18 May 1995) is an Albanian footballer who plays as a forward for KS Devolli in the Albanian Second Division.

His twin brother Dario also plays for Skënderbeu Korçë.

Career statistics
As of 2 February 2016

Honours 
Skënderbeu Korçë
 Albanian Superliga (4): 2011–12, 2012–13, 2013–14, 2014–15
 Albanian Supercup (2): 2013–14, 2014–15

References

External links
 Profile - Albanian FA

1995 births
Living people
Footballers from Korçë
Albanian footballers
Association football forwards
Albania youth international footballers
KF Skënderbeu Korçë players
KF Adriatiku Mamurrasi players
KF Naftëtari Kuçovë players
KS Pogradeci players
Kategoria e Parë players
Kategoria e Dytë players